Kolau Nadiradze (24 February 1895 – 28 October 1990) was a Georgian poet and the last representative of Georgian Symbolist school.

Born in Kutaisi, Georgia (then part of the Russian Empire), Nadiradze studied law at the University of Moscow from 1912 to 1916.

Upon his return to Georgia, he became a founding member of the Georgian Symbolist group Tsisperqantselebi or 'Blue Horns' in 1915, with fellow writers Grigol Robakidze, Titsian Tabidze, Paolo Iashvili and Valerian Gaprindashvili, amongst others.
Nadiradze quickly came under the influence of modernism, particularly Emile Verhaeren, and emerged as one of the leading figures within the Blue Horns group.

His early Symbolist poetry was marked by a mystic aesthete with a notably critical and hopeless vision of pre-independence Georgia. His first poem published by the Blue Horn Journal, Dreaming of Georgia (ოცნება საქართველოზე), 1916, for instance, described a withered Georgian landscape of decrepit homes and crumbling ruins.  Prior to Georgia's brief independence (1918-1921) Nadiraze described the country as an 'idiot homeland, with a thankless task/ Aged, oppressed and tortured'

In 1921, the Red Army invaded Georgia and established a Soviet state.  Since Nadiradze's earlier writings were not overtly political, he was able to adapt to the Communist ideological requirements more easily than others of the Blue Horn group, and continued to produce poetry.  Under the Soviet Union, Nadiradze chiefly wrote patriotic poetry and prose, with a focus on realism and social issues.  He also made numerous translations of literary works, including Pushkin, Bunin, Bal'mont, Blok, Verlaine and Isahakyan.

Despite Nadiradze adherence to the regime, he was arrested along with the fellow symbolist writer Sergo Kldiashvili in the purge of 1937, although both poets escaped imprisonment when their NKVD interrogator was himself arrested and their files mislaid.  The incident caused Nadiradze to distance himself further from old writers of the Blue Horn group, and he would be the last surviving member.

In the perestroika years, already in his nineties, Nadiradze was able to publish his suppressed works from his early twenties, notably 25 February (25 თებერვალი) a short reaction to the Bolshevik takeover in 1921.

See also
Georgia
Censorship in the Soviet Union

References 

1895 births
1990 deaths
Burials at Didube Pantheon
Male poets from Georgia (country)
People from Kutaisi
20th-century poets from Georgia (country)
20th-century male writers
Soviet poets